Yanbu Airport  is an airport near Yanbu, Saudi Arabia. It offers both domestic and international service.

The airport's full name is Prince Abdul Mohsin bin Abdulaziz International  Airport.

Operations

The airport was upgraded in late 2009 to enable it to operate international flights with newly expanded arrival and departure lounges. The contract for the airport expansion project was signed with a national company in June 2006 at a cost of SR188 million. The airport features air bridges that link passengers directly with aircraft, a first for regional airports in the Kingdom. The airport only has 2 air-bridges, Gates 1 and 2.

With passenger terminal areas of 8,500 sq. meters, the airport can take up to 500 passengers an hour. The airport also features new control towers, cargo facilities, and security and safety systems.

The ground floor features shopping areas as well as cafes offering a variety of hot and cold sandwiches, pastries, ice-cream, and other desserts. Both the first cafe and shopping area are to open to the general public. Passengers proceed through an entrance area past the shopping area and cafe to enter the ticketing area, featuring four ticket counters. Once passengers are done with ticketing, they then proceed to the left of the ticketing area to security. Security also features customs and immigration for passengers departing to international destinations. There is also another cafe and a smaller shopping area directly after check-in/security, but these are open only to ticketed departing passengers. Passengers then proceed to the second floor (via stairs and escalators).

The second floor is where the 2 air-bridge gates are located. The second floor also features a third cafe (located next to Gate #2), as well as a lounge for first and business class Saudia passengers only (located between Gates #1 and #2). Both a prayer area and public toilet facilities are located on the second floor.

On 24 December 2009, Egypt's AlMasria Universal Airlines became the first international airline to serve the airport (with flights from Cairo).

Airlines and destinations

Domestic carriers Saudia, Flyadeal and Flynas only serve the domestic destinations listed below, while domestic carrier Nesma Airlines serves one international destination. All other international destinations are served by non-Saudi airlines.

See also 

 Saudi Railways Organization
 Al-Ahsa International Airport
 Prince Nayef bin Abdulaziz International Airport

References

External links
[Arabianaerospace.aero/yanbu-airport-authorised-for-international-traffic.html]

Airports in Saudi Arabia
Yanbu